Ganze Constituency is an electoral constituency in Kenya. It is one of seven constituencies in Kilifi County. The constituency has four wards, all electing Members of County Assembly for the Kilifi County Assembly. The constituency was established for the 1988 elections. After the IEBC adopted the Boundary commission's recommendation for new constituencies and boundaries, Ganze Constituency retained its name, and no major boundaries were altered.

Sokoke Ward after the March 10, 2013 General Elections, the then Councillor Hon. Teddy Mwambire was re-elected as the new Member of County Assembly (MCA) representing Sokoke Ward in the County Assembly of Kilifi. He is now the Deputy Speaker, Kilifi County Assembly.

Members of Parliament

Locations and wards

References

External links 
Map of the constituency

Constituencies in Kilifi County
Constituencies in Coast Province
1988 establishments in Kenya
Constituencies established in 1988